

The Cabinet

Patrick Manning